"Personally" is a song recorded by American singer-songwriter Karla Bonoff which was released as the lead single from her 1982 album Wild Heart of the Young. The song is Bonoff's only top 40 hit single.

First recordings
"Personally" was first recorded in 1973 by its composer Paul Kelly, with Gene Page producing: however the track was not released although Kelly would record a new version of his composition for his 1993 album Gonna Stick and Stay.

Karla Bonoff version 
Karla Bonoff learned of the song through Glenn Frey who was the intended producer of Bonoff's album Wild Heart of the Young (although ultimately Kenny Edwards would produce the album): (Karla Bonoff quote:)"Glenn Frey was a great collector of obscure R&B tunes. He used to play me all these really cool [songs]." Frey mentioned to Bonoff that he'd meant to send the Jackie Moore recording of "Personally" to Bonnie Raitt as a possible number for Raitt to record herself but for some reason Raitt hadn't received it: (Karla Bonoff quote:)"He was playing it for me and I said: "Maybe I could [record it]".

Highlighted by a solo by alto sax virtuoso Phil Kenzie, Bonoff's version of "Personally" spent 18 weeks on the Billboard Hot 100 with a number 19 peak: in Cash Box the track rose as high as #12 on the Top 100 Singles chart. Billboard ranked "Personally" as the 60th biggest hit of 1982.

Chart performance

Weekly charts

Year-end charts

Other versions

The song was covered in 1983 by American country music artist Ronnie McDowell. It was released in January 1983 as the first single and title track from his album Personally.  The song reached #10 on the Billboard Hot Country Singles & Tracks chart.

Chart performance - Ronnie McDowell

The first evident released recording of the song was by Jackie Moore whose 1978 single release reached #92 Hot Soul Singles chart.
"Personally" has also been recorded by Z. Z. Hill for his 1984 album Bluesmaster and by Helen Watson for her 1999 album Doffing.

References

1982 singles
1983 singles
1973 songs
Karla Bonoff songs
Jackie Moore songs
Ronnie McDowell songs
Song recordings produced by Buddy Killen
Columbia Records singles
Epic Records singles